This is a partial list of molecules that contain 6 carbon atoms.

See also
 Carbon number
 List of compounds with carbon number 5
 List of compounds with carbon number 7

C06